Bemban is a state constituency in Malacca, Malaysia, that has been represented in the Melaka State Legislative Assembly.

The state constituency was first contested in 2004 and is mandated to return a single Assemblyman to the Melaka State Legislative Assembly under the first-past-the-post voting system. , the State Assemblyman for Bemban is Mohd Yadzil Yaakub from the Parti Pribumi Bersatu Malaysia (PPBM).

Definition 
The Bemban constituency contains the polling districts of Pondok Kempas, Ayer Kangkong, Kesang Tua, Kesang Jaya, Ayer Barok, Taman Maju, Ayer Panas, Seri Bemban and Tehel.

Demographics

History

Polling districts
According to the gazette issued on 31 October 2022, the Bemban constituency has a total of 9 polling districts.

Representation history

Election results

References

Malacca state constituencies